The Northern Light is a 1958 novel by A. J. Cronin.  In the story, The Northern Light is a respected local newspaper which has just resisted a takeover bid from a London conglomerate.  The  book is about the London company's unsuccessful attempt to ruin the paper by running a sensationalist rival paper.

References

1958 British novels
Novels set in England
Little, Brown and Company books
Novels by A. J. Cronin
Victor Gollancz Ltd books

fr:La Lumière du nord